Josef Madlener (1881–1967) was a German artist, illustrator, and writer. He was born near in Amendingen (part of Memmingen). His work was published in various newspapers, magazines, and a few children's Christmas books, e. g. Das Christkind Kommt (1929) and Das Buch vom Christkind (1938). Madlener's Christmas art also appeared in several postcard series. The monograph  by Eduard Raps (1981) published for the artist's centenary, shows a sampling of Madlener's art.

The most famous of Madlener's paintings is Der Berggeist ("the mountain spirit"), from similarities in style dated to the period around 1925–30. The painting is reproduced on a postcard that was in the possession of J. R. R. Tolkien, marked "the origin of Gandalf". 
Zimmermann (1983:22) interviewed Madlener's daughter Julie (born 1910), who distinctly remembered her father painting Der Berggeist sometime after 1925/6. She also noted that the postcard version was "published in the late twenties by Ackermann Verlag München, in a folder with three or four similar pictures with motifs drawn from German mythology: a fairy lady of the woods, a deer carrying a shining cross between its antlers, 'Rübezahl', and possibly one more".
The whereabouts of the original was unknown for some sixty years, until it was auctioned on Sotheby's in July, 2005, and sold for 84,000 GBP.

The previous owner had met Madlener twice and described Madlener as being tall, about 185 cm. He recalled that Madlener liked to bake and, on his second visit in 1946 or 1947 served his own bread and much coffee. Having seen Der Berggeist on his previous visit, the visitor told the artist how much he loved it, and  Madlener promptly told his guest to give it a good home.

Publications
Das Christkind kommt (1929)
Das Buch vom Christkind (1938).

Literature
Eduard Raps Josef Madlener 1881 bis 1967, Memmingen, 1981.
Manfred Zimmermann, The Origin of Gandalf and Josef Madlener,  Mythlore 34, 1983.
Hans-Wolfgang Bayer and Johannes Hoyer, "Der Nachlaß des Memminger Künstlers Josef Madlener"  in: Schönere Heimat 87 (1998), 66–70.

References

External links
Foto and info (German) http://www.memmingen.de/76.html

1881 births
1967 deaths
20th-century German painters
20th-century German male artists
German male painters
German illustrators
Postcard artists
People from Memmingen